James O'Halloran (12 January 1872 – 28 April 1943) was an Australian cricketer. He played three first-class cricket matches for Victoria in 1897.

See also
 List of Victoria first-class cricketers

References

External links
 

1872 births
1943 deaths
Australian cricketers
Victoria cricketers
Cricketers from Melbourne
Marylebone Cricket Club cricketers
A. J. Webbe's XI cricketers